Ruchyi is a rural locality (a settlement) in Lavelskoye Rural Settlement of Pinezhsky District, Arkhangelsk Oblast, Russia. The population was 2 as of 2010.

Geography 
Ruchyi is located on the Sora River, 101 km southeast of Karpogory (the district's administrative centre) by road. Novolavela is the nearest rural locality.

References 

Rural localities in Pinezhsky District